Walnut Creek is a major stream in Coconino County, Arizona that is part of the Little Colorado River drainage basin.

Geography
Walnut Creek begins in a small valley near Mormon Mountain, in the Coconino National Forest. It flows northwest along the south side of Anderson Mesa where it is impounded in two reservoirs, Upper and Lower Lake Mary, which were dammed in the early 1900s to supply water to Flagstaff, several miles to the north. Before damming, Walnut Creek was one of the only reliable streams in this arid region, flowing consistently each spring with the melting of snowpack on the Colorado Plateau. After the Upper Lake Mary Dam was constructed in 1941, Walnut Creek dried up below the Lower Lake Mary Dam due to increased water diversions. Since then, the creek has flowed only during monsoon rains or exceptionally heavy snowmelt.

San Francisco Wash continues east, eventually discharging into Padre Canyon Wash, in turn flowing into Diablo Wash which joins the Little Colorado River near Leupp, Arizona. The San Francisco Wash is sometimes considered the lower part of Walnut Creek, and the total length of the stream would be  if this is included.

See also
 List of rivers of Arizona
 List of tributaries of the Colorado River

References

Rivers of Coconino County, Arizona
Rivers of Arizona